Thomas Levenson is an American academic, science writer and documentary film-maker. , he is Professor of Science Writing and director of the graduate program in science writing at the Massachusetts Institute of Technology. He has written six books: Ice Time: Climate, Science and Life on Earth; Measure for Measure: A Musical History of Science; Einstein in Berlin; The Hunt for Vulcan: And How Albert Einstein Destroyed a Planet, Discovered Relativity, and Deciphered the Universe (shortlisted for the Royal Society Insight Investment Science Book Prize 2016); Newton and the Counterfeiter and Money for Nothing: The Scientists, Fraudsters, and Corrupt Politicians Who Reinvented Money, Panicked a Nation, and Made the World Rich.

He also writes articles and reviews for newspapers and magazines.

Biography
Levenson's father was Joseph R. Levenson, a professor of history at University of California, Berkeley.

He earned his bachelor's degree in East Asian Studies from Harvard University.

He is married and lives in Massachusetts with his wife and son.

Notes

References
 Faculty: Writing and Humanistic Studies. Massachusetts Institute of Technology website. (Accessed 2012-03-16)
 Thomas Levenson. Faber and Faber website. (Accessed 2009-09-02)

Massachusetts Institute of Technology faculty
American science writers
Year of birth missing (living people)
Living people
Harvard University alumni